Kravay Jaqeli was a Georgian noble and a leading "aznauri" of the Jaqeli family, Botso's possible sister, Kravay, was married to the nobleman Samdzivari and was responsible for negotiating the surrender of Qutlu Arslan's rebellious party to Queen Tamar.

References

Bibliography 
 
 

Kravay
12th-century people from Georgia (country)
13th-century people from Georgia (country)